Wendy Morgan may refer to:

 Wendy Morgan (politician), former Deputy in the States of Guernsey
 Wendy Morgan (actress) (born 1958), English actress
 Wendy Morgan, pen name of Wendy Corsi Staub (born 1964), American writer